John Buttigieg may refer to:
John Buttigieg (footballer), Maltese Association (soccer) footballer and coach
John Buttigieg (rugby league), Australian rugby league footballer

See also
Buttigieg